The Beckman Young Investigators Award was established by Mabel and Arnold Beckman in 1991, and is now administered by the Arnold and Mabel Beckman Foundation. The Beckman Young Investigator (BYI) Program is intended to provide research support to promising young faculty members in the early stages of their academic careers. Awardees receive a substantial grant, over a period of three years. The intent is to foster "innovative departures" and the invention of methods, instruments and materials that will open up new avenues of research in the chemical and life sciences.

It has been awarded to the following scientists:

2021 
 Beau Alward
 Roxanne Beltran
 Margaret Byron
 Katherine Davis
 Robert Gilliard
 Tania Lupoli
 Brett McGuire
 Nicolas Pégard
 Alison Wendlandt
 Balyn Zaro
 Yingjie Zhang

2020 
 John Blazeck
 Jennifer Bridwell-Rabb
 Laura Duvall
 Andrea Giovannucci
 Stavroula Hatzios
 Sarah King
 James McKone
 Yue Wang

2019 
 Keriann Backus
  Chenfeng Ke
  Wesley Legant
  Frank Leibfarth
  Jarad Mason
  Jia Niu
  Kimberly See
  Leslie Schoop
  Kirk Wangensteen
  Brad Zuchero

2018 
Dmitriy Aronov
Alistair Boettiger
 Henry La Pierre
 Chen Li
 Jean-Hubert Olivier
 Ian Seiple
 Michaela TerAvest
 Ashleigh Theberge
 Weiwei Xie
 Xiaoji Xu

2017 
 Victor Acosta
 Jeremy Baskin
 Pamela Chang
 Dan Fu
 Erik Grumstrup
 A. Fatih Sarioglu
 Jose Rodriguez
 Bo Wang

2016 
 Yiyang Gong
 Markita Landry
 Zachary Pincus
 Gabriela Schlau-Cohen
 Sabrina Spencer
 Scott Warren
 Jing-Ke Weng
 Ke Xu

2015 
 Lawrence David
 David Flannigan
 Yevgenia Kozorovitskiy
 Chang Liu
 Patrick Mercier
 Peter Nemes
 Kang-Kuen Ni
 Alex Shalek

2014 
 Albert Bowers
 Ludovico Cademartiri
 Prashant Jain
 Reade Roberts
 Wesley Wong
 Yimon Aye
 Yuebing Zheng

2013
 Aaron Hoskins
 Christina Stallings
 Delphine Farmer

 Elena Gracheva
 Gordana Dukovic
 Hillel Adesnik
 Poul Petersen

2012
 Catherine A. Blish
 Farren J. Isaacs
 Frank Alber
 Louis Bouchard
 William Dichtel

2011

2010

2009 
 Anne McNeil
 Daniel Zilberman
 David Masopust
 Herschel Wade
 Jon Lai
 Marc Hammarlund
 Nicholas Putnam
 Ruth Ley
 Scott Phillips
 Soichiro Yamada
 Valeria Molinero

2008 
 Alla Grishok
 Andreas S. Tolias
 Clodagh O'Shea
 E. Charles H. Sykes
 Faik Akif Tezcan
 Ke Hu
 Martin D. Burke
 Michael J. Axtell
 Michelle Chang
 Pieter C. Dorrestein
 Stephen Rogers
 Steven Little
 Tehshik Yoon
 Todd M. Squires
 Vassiliy Lubchenko
 Zefeng Wang

2007
 Adrian Salic
 Alexander Deiters
 Amy J. Wagers
 Brent Stockwell
 Christopher W. Bielawski
 Eric S. Huseby
 Garegin Papoian
 Jay A. Gupta
 Joshua J. Coon
 Min Ouyang
 Rachel L. Wilson
 Sean Crosson
 Sean F. Brady
 Shu-Ou Shan
 Siavash K. Kurdistani
 Zemer Gitai

2006
 Abraham Stroock
 Andrey S. Krasilnikov
 Anton Nekrutenko
 Arthur Salomon
 David A. Gracias
 David Traver
 Geeta Narlikar
 Hopi Hoekstra
 Jeanne Hardy
 Jeffrey W. Bode
 Jingdong Tian
 Krystyn J. Van Vliet
 Laura Kaufman
 Lei Wang
 Manuel Llinas 
 Marc Johnson
 Michael Bulger
 Michael S. Strano
 Mohammad Movassaghi
 Phil S. Baran
 Raymond Schaak
 Sanjay Kumar
 Srinivasan S. Iyengar
 Susan Janicki
 Xi Chen

2005
 Audrey P. Gasch
 Carsten Krebs
 Christian Munz
 Christina D. Smolke
 Christopher Chang
 Chuan He
 Glenn Micalizio
 Hyongsok Soh
 Jeffrey J. Gray
 Jing Wang
 Josh Dubnau
 Joshua D. Rabinowitz
 Judith X. Becerra
 Justin P. Gallivan
 Matthew P. DeLisa
 Peng Jin
 Philip LeDuc
 Randy Bartels
 Rebekah Drezek
 Sarah O'Connor
 Stuart Licht
 Theresa M. Reineke
 Volney Sheen
 Yueh-Lin Loo

2004 
 Akhilesh Pandey
 Brenda S. Schulman
 Brian Kuhlman
 Christine D. Keating
 D. Tyler McQuade
 David M. Rector
 Garth Simpson
 Gavin MacBeath
 Guillermo Ameer
 Jay T. Groves
 Kent L. Hill
 Kevin P. White
 Lara K. Mahal
 Mark J. Schnitzer
 Martin T. Zanni
 Melanie S. Sanford
 Michael H. B. Stowel
 Michael T. Green
 Paul A. Maggard

2003
 Adam Matzger
 Alexander Li
 Consuelo de Moraes
 Darrell Irvine
 David Lin
 David Lynn
 Douglas Robinson
 Douglas Smith
 Gregory Odorizzi
 Heather C. Allen
 Kevin Yarema
 Kim Orth
 Kristi Kiick
 Lu Chen
 Paul Hergenrother
 Pingyun Feng
 Rustem Ismagilov
 Sue Biggins
 Xiaowei Zhuang
 Zhan Chen

2002
 Andrei Sanov
 Bingwei Lu
 Carla Koehler
 Colin Nuckolls
 Daniel Minor
 David Chan
 David Liu
 Gregory Weiss
 Guoping Feng
 Heather Carlson
 James Schneider
 Jason Hafner
 Melody Swartz
 Peidong Yang
 Shiv Halasyamani
 Yi Sun

2001
 Geoffrey Chang
 Gerard C. L. Wong
 Gero Miesenboeck
 Guowei Fang
 Hays S. Rye
 Jonathan Wilker
 Justin Du Bois
 Koen Visscher
 Leslie B. Vosshall
 Linda C. Hsieh-Wilson
 Mark C. Hersam
 Michael J. Caterina
 Paul Cremer
 Paul V. Braun
 William B. Connick
 Zhibin Guan

2000
 Aaron W. Harper
 Angela M. Belcher
 Donald H. Burke
 Erik J. Sorensen
 Geoffrey Coates
 James B. Ames
 Jeffrey G. Saven
 Karlene A. Cimprich
 L. Andrew Lyon
 Raffi V. Aroian
 Sarah H. Tolbert
 Sean M. Burgess
 Steven E. Jacobsen
 Vicki Colvin
 Virginia W. Cornish
 Wen Bin Lin

1999
 Christopher Lima
 Claudia Turro
 Craig Hunter
 Daniel Feldheim
 Deborah Wuttke
 Douglas Barrick
 George O'Doherty
 John Zhang
 Lee Bardwell
 Mahdi Abu-Omar
 Mei Hong
 Michelle Wang
 Ram Sasisekharan
 Sheila Nirenberg
 Todd Martinez
 Wilfred A. Van Der Donk

1998
 Annelise E. Barron
 Carolyn R. Bertozzi
 Charles Brenner
 David Y. Gin
 John L. Bowman
 Joseph Z. Tsien
 Kit J. Pogliano
 Mark C. Lonergan
 Michael D. Sheets
 Richard W. Roberts
 Robert M. Strongin
 Susana Cohen-Cory
 Thomas J. Wandless
 Timothy J. Deming
 William C. Smith
 Yang Dan

1997
 Alexei A.Stuchebrukhov
 David S. Bredt
Elizabeth Gavis
 Jason Shear
 John T. Fourkas
 Michael K. Rosen
 Rafael Yuste
 Raymond Deshaies
 Scott Strobel
 Sonbinh T. Nguyen
 Sonny C. Lee
 Stacey Shane Bent
 Terence Hwa
 Tito A. Serafini
 Weihong Tan
 Yian Shi

1996
 Chen-Ming Fan
 Erin Schulman
 Gang-Yu Liu
 Jennifer A. Doudna
 Karl T. Mueller
 Klaus Schmidt-Rohr
 Leemor Joshua-Tor
 Lucio Frydman
 Ronald Breaker
 Roya Maboudian
 Scott Reid
 Shuming Nie
 Stephen J. Kron
 Susan R. Wente
 William Schafer
 Yi Lu

1995
 Arthur Palmer
 David Baker
 Frederick M. Hughson
 Jefferson Foote
 Lawrence R. Sita
 Lizbeth Hedstrom
 Marcos Dantus
 Melissa Hines
 Michael J. Mahan
 Michael L. Nonet
 Nancy Allbritton
 Nikola P. Pavletich
 Paul E. Laibinis
 Susan Marqusee

1994
 Alcino Silva
 Anna Marie Pyle
 David M. Ornitz
 James D. Marks
 James S. Nowick
 Laura L. Kiessling
 Michael J. Natan
 Norbert Scherer
 Raymond C. Stevens
 Robert T. Kennedy
 Seung Koo Shin
 Yves Rubin

1993
 Arlene Sharpe
 David C. Schwartz
 David W. Piston
 Erick M. Carreira
 Jeffrey Field
 John H. Griffin
 Jonathan Ellman
 Luping Yu
 Michael H. Hecht
 Michael J. Sailor
 Nancy Makri
 Reginald M. Penner
 Sheila S. David
 Teresa R. Strecker

1992
 A. J. Shaka
 Chad A. Mirkin
 David A. Horne
 Eric T. Kool
 Evan R. Williams
 Jose N. Onuchic
 Leslie Bell
 Martin Yanofsky
 Michael J. Therien
 Patricia A. Bianconi
 Philip A. Anfinrud
 Robert M. Weis

1991
 Curtis A. Monnig
 David A. Laude
 Douglas Koshland
 Frederick Cross
 Kathy L. Rowlen
 Maria Jasin
 Mercouri G. Kanatzidis
 Michelle Hanna
 Nancy Carrasco
 Reza Ghadiri
 Ron Frostig
 Sharon L. Neal

References

American awards
Science and technology awards